James Murray Yale ( – 7 May 1871) was a clerk, and later, a Chief trader for the Hudson's Bay Company, during the late North American fur trade, as they were competing with the Montreal based Northwest Company and the American Fur Company of John Jacob Astor. During his career, he would negotiate and compete with Americans, French Canadians, Russians, and Indians for market shares. He is best remembered for having given his name to Fort Yale, British Columbia, which became the city of Yale during the gold rush, and eventually, became the Yaletown district of Downtown Vancouver.

Biography 

Yale was born in 1798 in Lachine, Quebec, a borough of the city of Montreal. The area was previously known as Lower Canada, and belonged to Nouvelle-France. In 1815, he joined the Hudson's Bay Company, and served first at Fort Wedderburn on Lake Athabasca. This post had just been built by John Clarke in an effort to secure a foothold for the HBC in Athabasca, the great stronghold of the North West Company. In April 1817, Yale was kidnapped by the North West Company and taken to Tideè lake for five months. In 1821, he was moved to New Caledonia and put in charge of Fort Astoria, renamed Fort George in honor of King George III of Britain, until 1824. During his tenure there, he  would narrowly escape death, as during his absence, the Fort was attacked, and his men, murdered by the Indians.

  Chief Whattlekainum : No, do not try to hurt the Sky-people ; you can not kill them because they are supernatural. They come from the sky. There are as many of them as the stars. If you try to kill them, more will come and they will kill us all. You saw how they took fire into their stomachs and were not burned ; you saw the thunder-stick. No, you must not do what you plan.--The entry in Fort Langley : outpost of Empire, by a chief of the Indians, referring to the fur traders as Sky-people

Yale then served at Fort Alexandria and Fort St. James. When he was unwell in 1827, he was sent to Fort Vancouver where medical care was provided to him. Later in that year, Yale accompanied Governor George Simpson on his exploratory trip down the Fraser River. At the end of the journey, Yale remained in Fort Langley, where he worked as a clerk under Chief James McMillan. McMillan was one of those who took part in the acquisition by the HBC of Fort Astoria and Fort Okanogan; forts that belonged to their competitor John Jacob Astor and his Pacific Fur Company. Astor initial plan was to create a fur monopoly in the Columbia district by allying himself with the North West Company, who were qualified as Lords of the fur trade in Montreal, but they had refused the offer, as they were able to challenge the monopoly of the HBC by themselves.

Chief trader 

Yale then replaced Deputy Governor Archibald McDonald, husband of Princess Raven, the daughter of King Comcomly, a native Indian, as Chief trader on February 20, 1833. As a Chief trader, after the merger of the HBC and the Montreal based Northwest Company, he now had a share of the profits of the Hudson Bay company during the monopoly years, which were distributed among the 25 Chief factors, the 28 Chief traders and the shareholders in London. He achieved great success at Fort Langley, dealing in furs and pelts with the Indians, manufacturing wood barrels, and exporting cured salmons, which commanded high prices during the Crimean War of Napoleon III.

During his tenure, Yale would be saved by his postmaster from another murder attempt on his life, this time, by Tzouhalem, the chief of the Cowichan tribes. Later, an accident would cause the Fort to burn down. The Fort would be rebuilt thereafter by Yale and his men with the help of  Sir James Douglas. It became one of the largest forts ever built by the Hudson's Bay Company and Yale became its commander. While Yale was building his new fort, Sir George Simpson was at Hamburg, Germany, discussing with Baron Ferdinand von Wrangel, Governor of Russian America and Minister of the Navy. The Baron was the representative of the Russian-American Company, a fur trading enterprise chartered by Tsar Paul I of Russia, son of Catherine the Great.

The discussions evolved into an agreement for the HBC, and they obainted a lease for a part of Alaska, which belonged to Russia at the time. The aim of that lease was to block the American fur traders from dealing with the Russian trading posts in Alaskan territory and have them deal with the Hudson's Bay Company instead, thus increasing the trade volume at Fort Langley for Yale.  They started making caviar, as the recipe for making this delicacy was  part of the deal obtained from Russia. The salmon trade would eventually become a world-trade industry for the Fort and the area, developed by him and chief trader Archibald McDonald.

Disputes with the chief factor of Fort Vancouver, John McLoughlin, a French-Canadian, were frequent, as Fort Langley was second only in importance after his Fort, and resources were scarce. Eventually, the fur returns were on the decline and the shareholders in London were alerted, as a new technology made its apparition, the steamer Beaver. Steamships allowed for longer distance travel and lowered the need for a Fort to store the merchandise. It became in itself a sort of mobile trading post rather than a fixed infrastructure, thus accelerating the speed of trade. They suffered even more with the erection of Fort Victoria (British Columbia) in 1843, which would displace them as one of the main headquarters of the HBC. Governor Simpson didn't see Fort Langley suitable enough for a main depot, but acknowledged the impact it had on blocking the American fur traders from Boston and taking their market shares, as they used to control much of the Maritime fur trade. For the first ten years, the Fort produced 14,651 beaver skins, including 10,330 who were large prime pelts.

Gold rush 

During the gold rush era, gold reserves were found near the area of Fort Langley, of which Yale was the commander. He sent his associate Allard to build a new fort that he named Fort Yale. A wagon road was built named Old Yale Road and was used to move men and supplies to the gold mines. The city of Yale, British Columbia, became one of the biggest city in the region west of Chicago and all the way to the north of San Francisco, due to its positioning. They initially didn't want to participate in the gold rush as they anticipated future conflicts and wars with the Indians.

With unwelcomed foreigners and speculators coming in for the gold rush, the relationships established with the Indians and the supply chains were seriously disturbed. Thousands came from San Francisco after hearing the story that the HBC had shipped away 110 pounds of gold. With the prospect of wealth, the population of the United States territory of Washington and Oregon, as well as Europeans and other Indians tribes, were excited and came by all means of travel. The HBC would start using the Beaver steamship and the Otter steamship to serve the gold industry.

With the arrival of the Fraser Canyon Gold Rush, the Fraser Canyon War and the McGowan War started. It didn't take long for a white woman to be captured and held prisoner by the Indians. Yale sent 45 men with muskets and revolvers to rescue her. Royal Engineers troops of the British Army were sent, and a need for a new colony with a better legal structure was felt by the HBC and others. This would lead to the creation of British Columbia. The act of creation was made at Fort Langley, who would stay, for a time, the provisional colonial capital of the Royal colony of British Columbia.

Chief factor Douglas would announce the formation of the colony to the Secretary of State, Lord Edward Bulwer Lytton, in company of Admiral Robert Lambert Baynes, Chief Justice David Cameron, and Judge Matthew Baillie Begbie. Many administrative positions were created to better handle the gold rush and the monopoly agreement with the Hudson's Bay Company was revoked. Having worked so hard at building the trading operations at Fort Langley for the last 30 years, and seeing the HBC being displaced by the British, Yale decided he had enough and took his retirement. He returned for a brief time to Montreal, Canada, the area where he was born. He then later came back to Vancouver Island and bought land near his old friends of the HBC in Victoria, British Columbia, and resided there thereafter. He never returned to Fort Langley.

Legacy 

Yale had three daughters:

Eliza Yale (1829-1865), married Henry Newsham Peers, Chief trader for the HBC, and Captain during the American Indian Wars for Issac Stevens, 1st Governor of Washington.

Aurelia Yale (1839-1931), married John D. Manson, son of Donald Manson, Chief factor for the HBC, and Félicité Lucier, daughter of fur trader Étienne Lucier, an early founder of Fort Astoria for John Jacob Astor.

Isabella Yale (1840-1927), married Chief trader George Stewart Simpson, son of Sir George Simpson, the Scottish Canadian Governor of the Hudson's Bay Company and Prince Rupert's Land. 

Sir Simpson was one of the most important man in the North American fur trade, and was a Board director and shareholder of Canada’s first bank, the Bank of Montreal, as well as of the Bank of British North America, the Montreal and Lachine Railroad, the Champlain and St. Lawrence Railroad, the St. Lawrence and Atlantic Railroad, the Grand Trunk Railway, and the Montreal Ocean Steamship Company.

He was also a member of the Beaver Club, and did business with Canada's richest man Sir Hugh Allan, Sir John Rose, Sir Alexander Mackenzie, President David Torrance, minister Luther H. Holton, Senator George Crawford, Senator Thomas Ryan, banker John Redpath, and bankers John Molson and William Molson. At his death in 1860, he left an estate worth over £100,000, which in relation to GDP, amounted to half a billion dollars in 2023 Canadian money.

When the city of Yale (British Columbia) was founded in 1848, it was named after James Murray Yale. First as Fort Yale, then as Yale, which eventually gave its name to the Yaletown district of Downtown Vancouver.

James Murray Yale was also a distant cousin of Governor Elihu Yale who founded Yale University, being a descendant of his uncle, Thomas Yale, stepson of Governor Theophilus Eaton. Captain Thomas Yale was a merchant and landowner, and had been one of the founders of New Haven Colony, Connecticut. Many other members of the Yale family were merchants-entrepreneurs as well, such as Capt. Elihu Yale (1747), his uncle, a manufacturer of bayonets and scythes during the American Revolutionary War, and Moses Yale Beach, his cousin, a media magnate and one of the richest men in New York. 

His brother, Andrew Yale, was also a manufacturer of ships and barges in Montreal, and did business with Canadian Entrepreneur Luther Hamilton Holton.

Yale was known as “Little Yale” because of his short stature about which he was sensitive. Chief Factor Sir James Douglas, Governor of the Colony of British Columbia, his superior in the HBC, a big man, took a quiet delight in standing near Yale and observing his discomfiture. In his famous “Character Book”, Governor Simpson devoted an entry to Yale:

“A sharp active well conducted very little man but full of fire with the courage of a Lion. Deficient in Education, but has a good deal of address & Management with Indians and notwithstanding his diminutive size is more feared and respected than some of our 6 feet men.”“--The entry in the Dictionary of Canadian Biography, Volume X

External links 
 Biography at the Dictionary of Canadian Biography Online
   Fort Astoria 1792-1845 (Early Exploration, Fur Trade, Missionaries, and Settlement)

References

1790s births
1871 deaths
Year of birth uncertain
Hudson's Bay Company people
Pre-Confederation British Columbia people
Canadian fur traders
People from Lachine, Quebec
Anglophone Quebec people